Mandlakazi Keleku is a South African politician who has represented the African National Congress (ANC) in the Eastern Cape Provincial Legislature since 2019. She was elected to her seat in the 2019 general election, ranked 44th on the ANC's provincial party list. She is also a member of the ANC Women's League in the Chris Hani region.

References

External links 

 

African National Congress politicians
Living people
Year of birth missing (living people)
Members of the Eastern Cape Provincial Legislature
21st-century South African politicians